Joseph Eddy Fontenrose (17 June 1903, Sutter Creek – July 1986, Ashland, Oregon) was an American classical scholar. He was centrally interested in Greek religion and  Greek mythology; he was also an expert on John Steinbeck, commenting on the mythology in Steinbeck's work.

He was from Sutter Creek, California. Most of his academic career was spent at University of California, Berkeley, where he had graduated in 1925 in Political Science, after an instructor position he held from 1937.  An early influence was Ivan Linforth. He was made a professor in 1955, chaired the classics department, and became professor emeritus.

His politics were known to be socialist. He gave public support in the early 1960s to the Free Speech Movement and Young People's Socialist League. He showed a more conservative side in relation to student activism as it touched teaching.

In his 1966 book, The Ritual Theory of Myth, he subjected the myth-ritual theory to an intense attack, targeting the views of some of the associated scholars, particularly Lord Raglan and Stanley Edgar Hyman.

Works
Python; a study of Delphic myth and its origins (1959)
John Steinbeck; an introduction and interpretation (1963)
The Ritual Theory of Myth (1966)
The Delphic Oracle: Its Responses and Operations (1978)
Orion: The Myth of the Hunter and the Huntress (1981)
Steinbeck's Unhappy Valley. A Study of The Pastures of Heaven (1981)
Classics at Berkeley, The First Century (1869-1970) (1982)
Didyma. Apollo's Oracle, Cult and Companions (1988)

Notes

External links
 
"Joseph Edward Fontenrose, Classics: Berkeley"

1903 births
1986 deaths
American classical scholars
Classical scholars of the University of California, Berkeley
Scholars of Greek mythology and religion